Marton is a hamlet in the East Riding of Yorkshire, England, and in an area known as Holderness.

Marton forms part of the civil parish of Burton Constable.

In 1823 Marton was in the civil parish of Swine, and the Wapentake and Liberty of Holderness. A Catholic chapel was the only place of worship. Population at the time was 129, with occupations including nine farmers and a shoemaker. A carrier, who was also a Licensed victualler, operated between the village and Hull twice weekly.

Marton was served from 1864 to 1964 by Burton Constable railway station on the Hull and Hornsea Railway.

To the south-east of the settlement is the Roman Catholic Church of the Holy Sacrament which is a Grade II listed building.

References

External links

Villages in the East Riding of Yorkshire
Holderness